The Dorchester Dolphins are a Canadian junior ice hockey team based in Dorchester, Ontario, Canada.  They play in the Provincial Junior Hockey League.

History

The Dolphins are the namesake of the town's long running tradition in intermediate and senior hockey.

The Dolphins played their first ever hockey game on September 14, 2012, at home against the Lucan Irish.  The Dolphins were victorious, 6–5.  Brendon O'Shaughnessy scored both the first and second goals in team history for the Dolphins against the Irish and Alex Hutcheson made 31 saves on 36 shots to pick up the first ever win.

The Dolphins would finish their first ever season in second place in their division and lose in the seventh game of the division final against the Lambeth Lancers to finish their season.

During the 2013–14 season, the Dolphins would finish third in a three-way footrace for the regular season championship.  The lack of a season banner did not deter them in the playoffs as they would beat both the Lambeth Lancers and Thamesford Trojans (the two teams who outpointed them) in the playoff's final two rounds to take home their first even SOJHL playoff championship.  By winning the title, the Dolphins also earned the league's second ever berth into the Clarence Schmalz Cup playdowns (Ayr Centennials being the first in 2013).  On March 21, 2014, in the second game of their quarter-final series against the Great Lakes Junior C Hockey League's Essex 73's, the Dolphins became the first SOJHL team to win a Junior C playoff game against a team from another league with a 6–5 overtime victory at home.

The 2016–17 season marked an historic run for the dolphins who finished the regular season undefeated with one tie, missing the perfect season by one point. This regular season record brings them to a tie with Belle River who also had the same record, as the best season in Jr. C.

Season-by-season standings

Current team

Current roster
Updated February 1, 2019.

|}

Staff
<small>Updated February 27, 2019

References

External links
Dolphins webpage
League

Ice hockey teams in Ontario
2012 establishments in Ontario
Ice hockey clubs established in 2012
Southwestern Ontario